Sam Byers (born 1979) is a British novelist. He was born in Bury St Edmunds and now lives in Norwich, where he studied at the University of East Anglia (MA Creative Writing, 2004; PhD, 2014).

Byers' debut novel Idiopathy, a satire based on the spread of a BSE-like disease, received a Betty Trask Award and the Waterstones 11 prize. Idiopathy was also shortlisted for the 2013 Costa Book Awards First Novel award, and longlisted for the 2014 Desmond Elliott Prize.

In 2018 Byers published his second novel, Perfidious Albion, "a new media satire that switches into a hi-tech dystopia centred on class politics."

Awards

2014 Betty Trask Award, Idiopathy
2013 Waterstones 11, Idiopathy

Bibliography
 Idiopathy (2013)
 Perfidious Albion (2018)
 Come Join Our Disease (2021)

References

1979 births
Living people
Alumni of the University of East Anglia
British writers
21st-century British novelists